Sir John Guildesborough or Gildesburgh ( 1331 – 1389) was Knight of the Shire for Essex and Speaker of the House of Commons of England in 1380. He was knighted on 14 August 1378.

He was born circa 1331 and educated at Oxford University. He was elected a Knight of the Shire to represent Essex five times between 1380 and 1388 and elected speaker of the house for both parliaments in 1380.

Marriages
He married, firstly, Margery, daughter and coheir of Sir Henry Garnet of Wennington and secondly, Elizabeth, daughter and eventual heiress of William Pembridge. He had no surviving children.

See also
List of speakers of the House of Commons of England

References

1330s births
1389 deaths
Speakers of the House of Commons of England
People from Essex
Alumni of the University of Oxford
Year of birth uncertain
English MPs January 1380
English MPs November 1380
English MPs February 1383
English MPs 1385
English MPs February 1388
English knights